Hypatopa fluxella is a moth in the family Blastobasidae. It is found in the United States, including Texas, Louisiana and Maine.

References

Moths described in 1873
Hypatopa